Zamora is a Spanish province of western Spain, in the western part of the autonomous community of Castile and León. It is bordered by the provinces of Ourense, León, Valladolid, and Salamanca, and by Portugal. Currently the province has a population of 185,432 (2014) with nearly a third living in the capital Zamora.

Municipalities
Overall the province has a total of 250 municipalities which are listed below:

See also
Geography of Spain
List of cities in Spain

References

Municipalities of the Province of Zamora
Zamora